Tonkin House was a Japanese video game publisher owned by Tokyo Shoseki, which was active in late 1980s and early 2000s.

Video games
 Dig & Spike Volleyball (1992, SNES)
 Felicia  (1995, Super Famicom)
 Ugetsu Kitan (1996, PlayStation)

See also
Tokyo Shoseki

References

 Game Spot
 Neo Seeker
 Game FAQs
 UVL

Video game companies established in 1988
Video game companies of Japan
Video game publishers